Premier International IB Continuum School is a private boarding school situated in Satdobato Khumaltar, Lalitpur District, Nepal,  away from the Kathmandu ring road. Premier is accessible from any part of  Kathmandu by public transport. It was established in 2007. It has classes from kindergarten to grade 12, which is fully affiliated and sub-divided into IB Primary Years Programme and IB Middle Years Programme. This institution has represented as the first PYP and MYP school in Nepal.

This school has standardized as the sister organization of Montessori Kinderworld and Nepal Montessori Training Centre (NMTC) and is a candidate school for the IB Diploma Programme.

School curriculum 

In order to accomplish the goal, school delivers a curriculum designed to meet the needs of each student through the application of International IB Curriculum. The curriculum is taught through the Developmental Interactive Approach. English is the medium of instruction. Along with an option Chinese Language class to ensure that the knowledge imparted upon the children is compatible globally.

IB Programme 
Premier International IB Continuum School is the first IB World School in Nepal to have International IB PYP and MYP. It is authorized by the Switzerland-based International Baccalaureate Organisation (IBO) on 2014. Only the schools authorized by the IBO as IB World Schools are eligible to hoist the four years IB curriculum programmes. This is to be renewed every four years.

References 

Lists of schools in Nepal
International schools in Nepal
Schools in Kathmandu
2007 establishments in Nepal
Educational institutions established in 2007